The Wright Brothers Medal was conceived of in 1924 by the Dayton Section of the Society of Automotive Engineers, and the SAE established it in 1927 to recognize individuals who have made notable contributions in the engineering, design, development, or operation of air and space vehicles. The award is based on contributed research papers.

The award honors Wilbur and Orville Wright as the first successful builders of heavier-than-air craft, and includes an image of the Wright Flyer, the plane which they flew in 1903 at Kitty Hawk, North Carolina.

Awardees and research topics: 1928-1975
1928 Clinton Hunter Havill - Aircraft Propellers.
1929 Ralph Hazlett Upson - Wings - A Coordinated System of Basic Design.
1930 Theodore Paul Wright - The Development of a Safe Airplane - The Curtis Tanager.
1931 Stephen Joseph Zand: A Study of Airplane and Instrument Board Vibration
1932 Edward Pearson Warner: The Rational Specifications of Airplane Load Factors
1933 Eastman Nixon Jacobs: The Aerodynamics of Wing Sections for Airplanes
1934 Rex Buren Beisel, A. L. MacClain, and F. M. Thomas: Cowling and Cooling of Radial Air-Cooled Aircraft Engines
1935 William Littlewood: Operating Requirements for Transport Airplanes
1936 R. J. Minshall, J. K. Ball, and F. P. Laudan: Problems in the Design and Construction of Large Aircraft
1937 Richard V. Rhode - Gust Loads on Airplanes
1938 no award given
1939 Kenneth A. Browne: Dynamic Suspension - A Method of Aircraft Engine Mounting
1940 Clarence Leonard Johnson: Rudder Control Problems on Four-Engined Airplanes
1941 Samuel Jasper Loring: General Approach to the Flutter Problem
1942 Charles R. Strang: Progress in Structural Design Through Strain-Gage Technique
1943 Costas E. Pappas: The Determination of Fuselage Moments
1944 Kenneth Campbell: Engine Cooling Fan Theory and Practice
1945 Myron Tribus: Report on Development and Application of Heated Wings
1946 Frederick Van Horne Judd: A Systematic Approach to the Aerodynamic Design of Radial Engine Installations
1947 Henry B. Gibbons: Experiences of an Aircraft Manufacturer with Sandwich Material
1948 Kermit Van Every: Aerodynamics of High Speed Airplanes
1949 Homer J. Wood and Frederick Dallenbach: Auxiliary Gas Turbines for Pneumatic Power in Aircraft Applications
1950 James Charles Floyd: The Avro C102 Jetliner
1951 Orville Albert Wheelon: Design Methods and Manufacturing Techniques with Titanium
1952 W. J. Kunz, Jr.: A New Technique for Investigating Jet Engine Compressor Stall and Other Transient Characteristics
1953 D. N. Meyers and Z. Ciolkosz: Matching the Characteristics of Helicopters and Shaft Turbines
1954 John M. Tyler and E. C. Perry, Jr.: Jet Noise
1955 Wendell E. Reed: A New Approach to Turbojet and Ramjet Engine Controls
1956 Charles Horton Zimmerman: Some General Considerations Concerning VTOL Aircraft
1957 Alf F. Ensrud: Problems in the Application of High Strength Steel Alloys in the Design of Supersonic Aircraft
1958 Kermit Van Every: Design Problems of Very High Speed Flight
1959 Milford G. Childers: Preliminary Design Considerations for the Structure of a Trisonic Transport
1960 Ferdinand B. Greatrex: By-Pass Engine Noise
1961 Carleton M. Mears and Robert L. Peterson: Mechanization on Minimum-Energy Automatic Lunar Soft-Landing Systems
1962 Robert P. Rhodes, Jr., D. E. Chriss, and Philip M. Rubins: Effect of Heat Release on Flow Parameters in Shock Induced Combustion
1963 Sitaram Rao Valluri, James B. Glassco, and George Eugene Bockrath: Further Considerations of a Theory of Crack Propagation in Metal Fatigue
1964 Marion O'Dell McKinney, Jr., Richard E. Kuhn, and John P. Reeder: Aerodynamics and Flying Qualities of Jet V/STOL Airplanes
1965 W. W. Williams, G. K. Williams, and W. C. J. Garrard: Soft and Rough Field Landing Gears
1966 Julian Wolkovitch: An Introduction to Hover Dynamics
1967 John A. McKillop: Flutter Characteristics of the Slap Tail
1968 Leonard J. Nestor and Lawrence Maggitti, Jr.: Effects of Dynamic Environments on Fuel Tank Flammability
1969 W. N. Reddisch, A. E. Sabroff, P. C. Wheeler, and J. G. Zaremba: A Semi-Active Gravity Gradient Stabilization System
1970 J. Hong: Advanced Bonding for Large Aircraft
1971 no award given
1972 Dwight Henry Bennett and Robert P. Johannes: Combat Capabilities and Versatility Through CCV
1973 Richard E. Hayden: Fundamental Aspects of Noise Reduction From Powered Lift Devices
1974 Michael J. Wendl, Gordon G. Grose, John L. Porter, and Ralph V. Pruitt: Flight/Propulsion Control Integration Aspects of Energy Management
1975 John A. Alic and H. Archang: Comparison of Fracture and Fatigue Properties of Clad 7075-T6 Aluminum in Monolithic and Laminated Forms

Awardees
Source: SAE International
1976 no award given
1977 - Raymond M. Hicks and Garret N. Vanderplaats
1978 no award given
1979 Gary E. Erickson, Dale J. Lorincz, William A. Moore, and Andrew M. Skow: Effects on Forebody, Wing and Wing-Body-LEX Flowfields in High Angle of Attack Aerodynamics
1980 Walter S. Cremens: Thermal Expansion Molding Process for Aircraft Composite Structures
1981 Raymond M. Hicks: Transonic Wing Design Using Potential Flow Codes -- Successes and Failures
1982 Andre Fort and J. J. Speyer: Human Factors Approach in Certification Flight Test
1983 Carol A. Simpson: Integrated Voice Controls and Speech Displays for Rotorcraft Mission Management
1984 Robert J. Englar and James H. Nichols Jr.
1985 Charles W. Boppe
1986 James A. Hare
1987 Charles P. Blankenship and Robert J. Hayduk
1988 Benton C. Clark III
1989 Charles W. Boppe and Warren H. Davis
1990 Mariann F. Brown and Susan Schentrup
1991 Lourdes M. Birckelbaw and Lloyd D. Corliss: Handling Qualities Results of an Initial Geared Flap Tilt Wing Piloted Simulation
1992 G. J. Bastiaans, Steve D. Braymen, S. G. Burns, Shelley J. Coldiron, R. S. Deinhammer, William J. Deninger, R. P. O'Toole, Marc D. Porter, and H. R. Shanks: Novel Approaches to the Construction of Miniaturized Analytical Instrumentation
1993 no award given
1994 Timothy Geels, Tom McDavid, Greg Robel, and Tze Siu: DGPS Precision Landing Simulation
1995 Robert R. Wilkins Jr.: Designing the Conceptual Flight Deck for a Short Haul Civil Transport/Civil Tiltrotor
1996 B. A. Moravec and Michael W. Patnoe
1997 James R. Fuller: Evolution And Future Development Of Airplane Gust Loads
1998 Robert S. McCann, Becky L. Hooey, Bonny Parke,  Anthony D. Andre, David C. Foyle, and Barbara G. Kanki
1999 Jeremy S. Agte, Robert Sandusky, and Jaroslaw Sobieski
2000 no award given
2001 Maurizio Apra, Marcello D'Amore, Maria Sabrina Sarto, Alberto Scarlatti, and Valeria Volpi: VAM-LIFE: Virtual Aircraft ElectroMagnetic Lightning Indirect Effect Evaluation
2002 Gary L. Boyd, Alfred W. Fuller, and Jack Moy: Hybrid-Ceramic Circumferential Carbon Ring Seal
2003 Timothy J. Bencic, Colin S. Bidwell, Michael Papadakis, Arief Rachman, and See-Cheuk Wong: An Experimental Investigation of SLD Impingement on Airfoils and Simulated Ice Shapes
2004 Philip Freeman: A Robust Method of Countersink Inspection Using Machine Vision
2005 John W. Fisher, Michael T. Flynn, Eric J. Litwiller, and Martin Reinhard: Lyophilization for Water Recovery III, System Design
2006 James R. Akse, James E. Atwater, Roger Dahl, John W. Fisher, Frank C. Garmon, Neal M. Hadley, Richard R. Wheeler Jr, Thomas W. Williams: Development and Testing of a Microwave Powered Solid Waste Stabilization and Water Recovery System
2007 Peter O. Andreychuk, Leonid S Bobe, Nikolay N. Protasov, Nikolay N. Samsonov, Yury Sinyak, and Vladimir M. Skuratov: Water Recovery on the International Space Station: The Perspectives of Space Stations' Water Supply Systems
2008 Carl Jack Ercol: Return to Mercury: An Overview of the MESSENGER Spacecraft Thermal Control System Design and Up-to-Date Flight Performance
2009 Atle Honne, John T James, Dirk Kampf, Kristin Kaspersen, Dr Thomas Limero, Dr Ariel V. Macatangay, Dr Herbert Mosebach, Paul D Mudgett, Henrik Schumann-Olsen, Wolfgang Supper, and Gijsbert Tan: Evaluation of ANITA Air Monitoring on the International Space Station
2010 Henrik Kihlman, and Magnus Engström: Flexapods - Flexible Tooling at SAAB for Building the NEURON Aircraft
2011 Matthew Barker, Luke Hickson, Joeseph K-W Lam, Stephen Paul Tomlinson, and Darran Venn: Mathematical Model of Water Contamination in Aircraft Fuel Tanks
2012 Jerry Bieszczad, Michael Izenson, George Ford Kiwada, Patrick J Magari: Ultra- Compact Power System for Long-Endurance Small Unmanned Aerial Systems
2013 Ing Rafael Fernandes de Oliveira
2014 Troy Beechner, Kyle Ian Merical, Paul Yelvington
2015 no award given
2016 Tadas P. Bartkus, Peter Struk, Jen-Ching Tsao
2017 Christian Boehlmann, Wolfgang Hintze, Philip Koch, Christian Moeller, Hans Christian Schmidt, Jörg Wollnack
2019 Yuzhi Jin, Yuping Qian, Yangjun Zhang, Weilin Zhuge  - Tsinghua University

See also
 Wright Brothers Memorial Trophy
 List of aviation awards
 List of space technology awards
 List of engineering awards
 Prizes named after people

References

External links 
SAE: Wright Brothers Medal

Aerospace engineering awards
Space-related awards
Aviation awards
Awards established in 1927
Wright brothers